Emmanuel Karemera is a Rwandan politician, currently a member of the Chamber of Deputies in the Parliament of Rwanda.

See also
Politics of Rwanda

References 

Members of the Chamber of Deputies (Rwanda)
Living people
Year of birth missing (living people)